Mike “Moe” Hoffman was a U.S. soccer player who earned one cap with the U.S. national team in a 4-0 loss to Poland on August 10, 1973.  He started the game, but came off for Dan Counce in the 55th minute.

References

External links 

United States men's international soccer players
American soccer players
Association footballers not categorized by position
Year of birth missing